The GAZ-51 (nickname Gazon) was a Soviet truck manufactured by GAZ. Its first prototypes were produced before the end of World War II and has been influenced by Studebaker US6. The mass production started in 1946.

A 2.5 ton 4×2 standard variant was joined in 1947 by almost identical 2 ton 4×4 GAZ-63. Both variants were powered by  6-cylinder 3485 cc engine. GAZ-63s was manufactured with some changes until 1968 and production of GAZ-51 continued until 2 April 1975. The trucks were also manufactured under the Soviet license in Poland (as the Lublin-51), North Korea (as the Sungri-58) and China (as the Yuejin NJ-130).

Variants
GAZ-51: Standard production version. Produced in 1946–1955.
GAZ-51A: Modernized GAZ-51. Produced in 1955–1975.
GAZ-51W: Export version based on GAZ-51A. Produced in 1956–1975.
GAZ-51B: Multifuel-powered version. Produced since 1949.
GAZ-51C: Farm truck version. Produced in 1956–1975.
GAZ-51D:
GAZ-51F: GAZ-51 with experimental stratified charge engine.
GAZ-51I: Cab-chassis version. Produced in 1956–1975.
GAZ-51N: GAZ-51A with an extra fuel tank and GAZ-63 body. Produced in 1956–1975.
GAZ-51P: Tractor-trailer version. Produced in 1956–1975.
GAZ-51R: Utility taxi version. Produced in 1956–1975.
GAZ-51T: Cargo taxi version. Produced in 1956–1975.
GAZ-51Zh: LPG-powered version. Produced in 1954–1975.
GAZ-63: 4×4 version. Produced in 1948–1968.
 GAZ-63A: 4x4 version with winch.
AP-41/GAZ-41: Prototype halftrack based on the GAZ-51.
GAZ-93: Dump truck version based on GAZ-51. Produced in 1951–1958.
GAZ-93A: Modernized GAZ-93. Produced in 1958–1975.
GAZ-93B: Export version of the GAZ-93A.
GAZ-93b: GAZ-93D with GAZ-93A chassis. Produced in 1956-?.
GAZ-93C: Prototype bulk cargo version.
GAZ-93D: Crop truck version.

Literature
 Andy Thompson, Trucks of the Soviet Union: The Definitive History, Behemoth Publishing LTD, 2017.

References

External links

Fan-Club GAZ-51
Gallery
Images of the North Korean Version including wood burning conversions

GAZ Group trucks
Soviet automobiles
Vehicles introduced in 1946
Rear-wheel-drive vehicles
Military vehicles introduced from 1945 to 1949